Dracaena tamaranae, or drago de Gran Canaria, is a species of endemic plants of the island of Gran Canaria, related to the dragon tree, Dracaena draco, and other species of Dracaena from East Africa. Since 1972, specimens of dragon tree have been identified in Gran Canaria with certain peculiarities. These were initially identified as specimens of Dracaena draco. However, a more detailed study and its cultivation allowed us to recognize that it was a different species. It was first described in 1998 by F. Marrero, A. Almeida, RS & Gonzalez-Martín.

Description  
This dragon tree has rigid, ribbed leaves that are pointed towards the tip and of a more bluish and grayish color than those of D. draco. Its bearing is less dense and branched, reaching more than 8 meters in height. The bark is grayish-yellow and somewhat shiny. The whitish-green inflorescences are arranged in a branched inflorescence up to 80–100 cm long. The seeds are globose and slightly compressed, about 6–7 mm in diameter.

It shows similarities with species from East Africa, such as Dracaena ombet and Dracaena schizantha, and from Arabia, such as Dracaena serrulata. It is believed that the species could have reached the Canary Islands during the Miocene period.

Differences with Dracaena draco 
 Ribbed leaves, more bluish and greyish in color, even in juvenile specimens.
 More branched inflorescence.
 Flowers with different characteristics.
 Smaller fruits and seeds.
 It is most similar to species from East Africa and Arabia, while D. draco has them with the dragon tree from the island of Socotra, in the Indian Ocean.

Distribution and habitat 

The dragon trees found are in the south of the island of Gran Canaria, in a more xeric zone than usual for Dracaena draco.

The dragon tree of Gran Canaria has been described as typical of the thermo-sclerophilic plant communities of the tropical-subtropical region. They are really xerophilous, inhabiting areas with rainfall of between 200 and 500 mm per year. The specimens found are located in the geologically oldest areas of the island, on generally inaccessible cliffs. These areas are home to remains of their original ecosystems: juniper and jarales. They coexist with species such as junipers, jaguars, wild olive trees, pines, etc.

It is in danger of extinction, is listed in the National Catalog of Threatened Species and needs a recovery plan.

Culture 
Due to the scarcity of specimens, its cultivation outside the scientific field is not yet possible. It is recommended, however, not to introduce specimens of D. draco in the area likely to host or be reforested with this species.

Taxonomy 
Dracaena tamaranae was described by Marrero Rodr. , RSAlmeida & Gonz.-Mart. and published in the Botanical Journal of the Linnean Society 128: 294. 1998.

Etymology 
Ver: Dracaena
tamaranae : related to Tamarán, an aboriginal name attributed to Gran Canaria.

References

Bibliography

External links 
 
 of Dracaena tamaranae
 Drago de Gran Canaria, Cabildo de Gran Canaria,

tamaranae
Endemic flora of the Canary Islands
Plants described in 1998